This article contains a list of restriction enzymes whose names start with A and have a clearly defined cutting site.

The following information is given for each enzyme:

 Name of Restriction Enzyme: Accepted name of the molecule, according to the internationally adopted nomenclature, and bibliographical references. Note: When alphabetizing, enzymes are first ordered alphabetically by the acronyms (everything before the roman numeral); then enzymes of a given acronym are ordered alphabetically by the roman numeral, treating the numeral as a number and not a string of letters. This helps keep the entries ordered hierarchically while also alphabetic.(Further reading: see the section "Nomenclature" in the article "Restriction enzyme".)
 PDB code: Code used to identify the structure of a protein in the PDB database of protein structures. The 3D atomic structure of a protein provides highly valuable information to understand the intimate details of its mechanism of action.
REBASE Number: Number used to identify restriction enzymes in the REBASE restriction enzyme database. This database includes important information about the enzyme such as Recognition sequence, source, and Isoschizomers, as well as other data, such as the commercial suppliers of the enzyme.
 Source: Organism that naturally produces the enzyme.
 Recognition sequence: Sequence of DNA recognized by the enzyme and to which it specifically binds. 
 Cut: Displays the cut site and pattern and products of the cut. The recognition sequence and the cut site usually match, but sometimes the cut site can be dozens of nucleotides away from the recognition site.
 Isoschizomers and neoschizomers: An isoschizomer is a restriction enzyme that recognizes the same sequence as another. A neoschizomer is a special type of isoschizomer that recognizes the same sequence as another, but cuts in a different manner. A maximum number of 8–10 most common isoschizomers are indicated for every enzyme but there may be many more. Neoschizomers are shown in bold and green color font (e.g.: BamHI). When "None as of [date]" is indicated, that means that there were no registered isoschizomers in the databases on that date with a clearly defined cutting site. Isoschizomers indicated in white font and grey background correspond to enzymes not listed in the current lists, as in this not listed enzyme:  Abc123I

Whole list navigation

Restriction enzymes

A

§ An HF version of this enzyme is available

Notes

Biotechnology
Restriction enzyme cutting sites
Restriction enzymes